Yima is a county-level city in Henan, China. It is under the administration of Sanmenxia. Yima is located in the western part of Henan province. Since ancient times, it had been a key stopover between Luoyang and Changan. The city had great strategic importance, being often a battlefield and a place for merchants to trade. In the 20th century, it became a wealthy city thanks to the mining and processing of coal.

As of 2018, the city population was 147,800, whilst the metropolitan area (extending into Mianchi county) had a population of 498,500.

Yima was founded two years before the Qin Dynasty established the new county system (it took 81 years to build the city). After the People's Republic of China was founded, Yima was given county-level status in Henan Province in 1981. It was originally under the administration of Luoyang, however since 1986, it has been under the administration of Sanmenxia. It is also one of China's top hundred counties, as well as the smallest city in China (112 square kilometers with a population of about 160,000).

Economy 
Yima has the advantage of being self-sustaining, allowing for redevelopment of its industry and increased economic growth. In 2010, the city's per capita GDP was over 70,000 RMB, which is about US$10,000. It ranks alongside moderately developed countries. In 2010, it was ranked first economically in Henan Province (perennial top five). The city is also known as "The Home of Martial Arts". Yima owes much of its wealth to the local coal mining and processing industry, its major employer being the Yimei Coal Group. At its peak in 2004, 76% of the local economy depended on coal. Since 2014, several local coal mines have been shut down due to coal overcapacity in China, causing the city to go in an economic decline. In 2019, 15 were killed by an explosion at a gas plant operated by Henan Coal Gas in Yima.

Geography
Yima is in the western part of Henan.

Climate

Yima is located in a warm temperate zone, on the southern edge of the North Subtropics. There are four distinct seasons and abundant sunshine. The average annual temperature is 12.4 °C. During July, the hottest month of the year, the annual temperature is 25.5 °C. In the coldest months, the average temperature is -2.1 °C. The average annual amount of sunshine is 2250.4 hours, with an average annual sunshine rate of 51%. In the spring and summer months, there are northwest winds. In the autumn and winter months, there are southeast winds. There are rich animal and plant resources, with a rainfall of 666.9 mm.

Administrative divisions
As 2012, this city is divided to 7 subdistricts.
Subdistricts

Transportation

China National Highway 310 also passes through Yima.

Cultural history 

Yima has a long and magnificent history and culture, being one of the cradles of ancient China. It has many territorial and historical sites, along with a famous ancient culture.

Hongqingsi Grottoes

Chu Pit Site

The site where Xiang Yu killed 200,000 Qin prisoners of war and thew their corpses into a hole. It is located in the village of Li Hengwan, west of the village of 20 Lipu, commonly known as the 10,000 pits. In 206 B.C., Xiang Yu massacred 200,000 Qin prisoners here. In the "History - Xiang Yu's notes", it says that "at night, the Chu army (led by Xiang Yu) killed 200,000 Qin soldiers in southern Xin'an (新安)", which is in present-day Yima. The site is pit-shaped, covering an area of 70 to 80 Mu (a Mu is an ancient unit for area, 1 Mu = 667 sq. m.). To the south, there was the Jianhe River, to the north, there was Tuling village. In the east and west, there were only flat plains. The hole's north was along LiXingWan Village. To the right, there was White Dragon Temple. In 1913, the Longhai Railway was built to run through the hole. Thus, the original shape no longer exists.

 Empress' Palace

 The Old City of Qin Xin'an

 Yima's Ginkgo Fossils

In recent years, archaeologists discovered the site, which contains the world's oldest Gingko fossils. One of those fossils has been dated to 1.8 million years ago, this date was confirmed in the International Organization of Palaeobotany's sixth and seventh conferences.

References 

County-level divisions of Henan
Cities in Henan
Sanmenxia